Büyükhırka is a village in the Alaca District of Çorum Province in Turkey. Its population is 464 (2022). The village is populated by Kurds. Before the 2013 reorganisation, it was a town (belde).

References

Villages in Alaca District
Kurdish settlements in Çorum Province